Mujibism refers to the political view held and propagated by Sheikh Mujibur Rahman, the architect of the liberation movement of Bangladesh. Mujibism consists of four fundamental policies: nationalism, socialism, democracy, and secularism. On 7 June 1972, he said that before the country's liberation, the slogans were the six points, now the slogans were the four pillars. When the Constitution of Bangladesh was adopted in 1972, the four pillars become the four fundamental state policies of Bangladesh.

Background 
Sheikh Mujib's political views were formed by his experience and participation in the liberation movements during both the British period and Pakistani period. Abdul Gaffar Chowdhury opined that though Mujib was a close political disciple of Huseyn Shaheed Suhrawardy, his political character got shape under the influence A. K. Fazlul Huq, Abul Hashim, Subhas Chandra Bose, and Abdul Hamid Khan Bhashani.

Principles

Nationalism 

Sheikh Mujibur Rahman believed in language-based inclusionist nationalism. He believed that all Bangladeshis are Bengali. According to him, the Bengali language was the first pillar of nationalism. To him, the Bengali language was the quintessential element of Bengali identity binding together a culturally diverse region. He said that he would implement Bengali in all domains of life immediately after taking power. On 12 March 1975, he gave order to use Bengali in all government activities.

Socialism 

Socialism is the second pillar of Mujibism. He said that socialism in Bangladesh would be native and democratic.

According to him, the country's wealth belongs to all the people of Bangladesh. Everybody will have share in whatever would be produced. Exploitation would be stopped.

He said that the poor own the country and its all property, not the exploiters.

Democracy 

Sheikh Mujibur Rahman said that we believed in democracy. The people must have democratic rights and people's consensus must determine the course of the state. The people will elect the government of the country. He also said that, power does not reside in the bullets of guns. The people is power. He stated that the government stuffs and bureaucrats are the servants of the people. Opposing military governance, he said only military power cannot defend the sovereignty. It is the people who truly can defend the country. He wanted to establish socialism through democracy. He wanted to establish Bangladesh as an ideal democratic socialist country.

Secularism 

Secularism is the fourth pillar of Mujibism. He said, there would be no space for religious communalism. He said the state would be secular but freedom of religion would be guaranteed among other democratic rights. Hindus and Muslims and all other religious group would freely perform their respective religious activities.

Others 
As an opponent of colonialism, Sheikh Mujib expressed solidarity with liberation movements of occupied nations in different colonies. Mujib was also pacifist and was involved in Non-Aligned Movement.

Legacy 
When the Constitution of Bangladesh was adopted in 1972, the four pillars become the four fundamental state policies of Bangladesh. Today nationalism, socialism, democracy, and secularism remain the fundamental state principles of the Constitution.

References 

Doctrines
Sheikh Mujibur Rahman
Eponymous political ideologies
Cults of personality
Political movements in Bangladesh
Types of socialism